Scharnhorst class may refer to:

  - a German ship class of two cruisers active in World War I
  - a German ship class of two capital ships active in World War II